Camillo Boito (30 October 1836 – 28 June 1914) was an Italian architect and engineer, and a noted art critic, art historian and novelist.

Biography
Boito was born in Rome, the son of an Italian painter of miniatures. His mother was of Polish ancestry. He studied in Padua and then architecture at the Accademia di Belle Arti di Venezia (School of Fine Arts) in Venice. During his time there, he was influenced by Selvatico Estense, an architect who championed the study of medieval art in Italy. He taught architecture at the Venice School of Fine Arts until 1856 when he moved to Tuscany.

His agitation against the Austrian domination of Venice pressured him to leave, despite his position as adjunct professor at the Academy. In Florence he begins to write for the journal lo Spettatore edited by Celestino Bianchi.

In 1860, he was named professor of Superior Architecture at the Brera Academy in Milan. In Milan, he published for a number of journals, including Politecnico, Perseveranza, and Nuova Antologia.

During his extensive work restoring ancient buildings, he tried to reconcile the conflicting views of his contemporaries on architectural restoration, notably those of Eugène Viollet-le-Duc and John Ruskin. This reconciliation of ideas was presented at the III Conference of Architects and Civil Engineers of Rome in 1883 in a document later to be known as the "Prima Carta del Restauro" or the Charter of Restoration. This inaugural charter provided a set of principles for the restoration and conservation of monuments. In his 1893 set of dialogues on historic monuments, he develops this into eight points to be taken into consideration in the restoration of historical monuments:

 The differentiation of style between new and old parts of a building.
 The differentiation in building materials between the new and the old.
 Suppression of moldings and decorative elements in new fabric placed in a historical building.
 Exhibition in a nearby place of any material parts of a historical building that were removed during the process of restoration.
 Inscription of the date (or a conventional symbol) on new fabric in a historical building.
 Descriptive epigraph of the restoration work done attached to the monument.
 Registration and description with photographs of the different phases of restoration. This register should remain in the monument or in a nearby public place.  This requirement may be substituted by publication of this material.
 Visual notoriety of the restoration work done.

The concern was for maintaining authenticity in terms of the identification of original materials.  At the same time, the intention was to promote a "scientific" attitude toward restoration. Boito's principles were well accepted and inspired modern legislation on restoration of historical monuments in several countries.

Boito is perhaps most famous for his restoration of the Church and Campanile of Santi Maria e Donato at Murano, inspired by the theories and techniques of Viollet-Le-Duc. He also worked on the Porta Ticinese in Milan between 1856–1858 and famed Basilica of Saint Anthony in Padua in 1899. He designed the Cemetery of Gallarate.

Other architectural designs include Gallarate Hospital (in Gallarate, Italy) and a school in Milan. His most famous building in Milan is the Casa di Riposo per Musicisti which was built 1895 - 99. It was financed by the composer Giuseppe Verdi and serves as a rest home for retired musicians, and as a memorial for the composer, who is buried in the crypt of the chapel there. In the early 1900s, Boito helped shape Italian laws protecting historical monuments.

Boito died in Milan in 1914.

Literary works
Boito also wrote several collections of short stories, including a psychological horror short story titled "A Christmas Eve", a tale of incestuous obsession and necrophilia, which bears a striking similarity to Edgar Allan Poe's "Berenice." A short film adaptation was released in 2012.

Around 1882 he wrote his most famous novella, Senso, a disturbing tale of sexual decadence. In 1954, Senso was memorably adapted for the screen by Italian director Luchino Visconti and then, later, in 2002 into a more sexually disturbing adaptation by Tinto Brass.

Another story, "Un corpo" (also dealing with themes of sexual decadence and necrophilia), was adapted into an opera of the same title by the Greek composer Kharálampos Goyós, commissioned and premiered by the Experimental Stage of the Greek National Opera in 2008.

Arrigo Boito, Camillo's younger brother, was a noted poet, composer and the author of the libretti for Giuseppe Verdi's last two great operas, Otello and Falstaff.

See also
Scapigliatura
Senso

References

1836 births
1914 deaths
Architects from Rome
Italian art critics
19th-century Italian architects
Academic staff of Brera Academy
Writers from Rome
Italian people of Polish descent
19th-century Italian writers
Italian male short story writers
19th-century Italian short story writers
19th-century Italian male writers
Italian male non-fiction writers